The legislatures of communist states included:
Congress of Soviets and Supreme Soviet in the Union of Soviet Socialist Republics
People's Chamber and Chamber of States in the Democratic Republic of Germany
Great National Assembly in the People's Republic of Romania and the Socialist Republic of Romania
Federal Assembly in the Federative People's Republic of Yugoslavia and Socialist Federal Republic of Yugoslavia
People's Great Khural in the People's Republic of Mongolia
National Assembly of People's Power in the Republic of Cuba
National Assembly of Vietnam in the Socialist Republic of Vietnam
National People's Congress in the People's Republic of China
National Assembly in the Democratic People's Republic of Laos
Kampuchean People's Representative Assembly in Democratic Kampuchea
National Assembly in the People's Republic of Kampuchea
People's Assembly of Albania in the People's Republic of Albania and Socialist People's Republic of Albania
Sejm in the People's Republic of Poland
National Assembly in the People's Republic of Bulgaria
Parliament in the People's Republic of Hungary
National Assembly and Federal Assembly in the Republic of Czechoslovakia and the Socialist Republic of Czechoslovakia
Supreme People's Council in the People's Democratic Republic of Yemen
People's National Assembly in the People's Republic of the Congo
People's Assembly in the People's Republic of Mozambique
National Assembly in the People's Republic of Angola
Revolutionary National Assembly in the People's Republic of Benin
Supreme Revolutionary Council and People's Assembly in the Democratic Republic of Somalia
National Shengo in the People's Democratic Republic of Ethiopia
Supreme People's Assembly in the Democratic People's Republic of Korea

Due to their vanguard status, Communist parties were either the sole party represented in these legislatures, or held permanent majorities. In the latter case, the Communist parties were the dominant partners in popular fronts that were the sole organizations allowed to contest elections. The minor parties in these fronts were subservient to the Communist party, and had to accept the party's "leading role" as a condition of their continued existence.

The legislatures were vested with great lawmaking powers on paper, and in most cases all other government institutions were nominally subordinated to them. In practice, the doctrine of democratic centralism resulted in the legislatures being rubber stamps which held very little real, if any, practical power. They did little more than give legal sanction to decisions already made at the highest levels of the Communist parties. 

Legislative sessions were infrequent, usually only once or twice a year, and consequently legislative power was often vested in some form of standing committee elected by the legislature, usually titled presidium or state council, between its sessions. These committees had the power to issue decrees or regulations in lieu of law. The full legislature usually had the power to veto these  decrees or regulations at its next session, but this power was almost never exercised.

Historical legislatures
Communist states